The Springfield Daily News was a daily newspaper that was published independently in Springfield, Massachusetts, from 1911 to 1969,  and then as a merged paper through 30 May 1987. From 1968 through 2007, it was published by Daily News Publishing Company.

One of the more prominent journalists who worked on the Daily News was Brooks Atkinson, who took a job with the newspaper after graduating from Harvard College. He went on to become the assistant drama critic at the Boston Evening Transcript and chief drama critic at The New York Times.

Merger
The newspaper merged with the Springfield Morning Union and the Springfield Republican, becoming the Springfield Union News & Sunday Republican.  The Morning Union and the Daily News were published as morning and evening editions under their own names, with their own editorial stances, before becoming simply the Union-News in 1988. The Sunday paper was called The Sunday Republican.  The papers were part of the Newhouse Newspapers chain and were owned by a corporate entity called Springfield Newspapers. In 2001, the newspaper was merged with the Republican entirely, with the Daily News name dropped altogether.

See also

 The Springfield Republican
 History of American newspapers

References

External links

 Springfield Republican online edition

Defunct newspapers published in Massachusetts
Defunct companies based in Massachusetts
Mass media in Springfield, Massachusetts
Newspapers published in Massachusetts
Newspapers established in 1911
1911 establishments in Massachusetts